Jerome B. Friedman (born 1943) is a former United States district judge of the United States District Court for the Eastern District of Virginia.

Education and career

Born in Newark, New Jersey, Friedman received a Bachelor of Science degree from Old Dominion College (now Old Dominion University) in 1965, and a Juris Doctor from Wake Forest University School of Law in 1969. He was a trust administrator for First Union National Bank from 1969 to 1970. He was in private practice from 1970 to 1985. He was a judge on the Virginia General District Court for Juvenile & Domestic Relations from 1985 to 1991. He was a judge on the Virginia Beach Circuit Court from 1991 to 1997, serving as chief judge from 1994 to 1997.

Federal judicial service

On June 26, 1997, Friedman was nominated by President Bill Clinton to a seat on the United States District Court for the Eastern District of Virginia vacated by Robert G. Doumar. Friedman was confirmed by the United States Senate on November 7, 1997, and received his commission on November 12, 1997. He assumed senior status on November 30, 2010, and retired from the court on August 19, 2011.

See also
 List of Jewish American jurists

References

1943 births
Living people
Old Dominion University alumni
Wake Forest University School of Law alumni
Judges of the United States District Court for the Eastern District of Virginia
United States district court judges appointed by Bill Clinton
Lawyers from Newark, New Jersey
20th-century American judges
21st-century American judges